Harlington may refer to several places in England:

Harlington, Bedfordshire
Harlington Manor
Harlington, London
Harlington, South Yorkshire

See also
Arlington (disambiguation)
Harlingen (disambiguation)
Harlington-Straker Film Studio, a fictional film studio in UFO (TV series)